The 32nd annual Cairo International Film Festival was held from November 18 to November 28, 2008. Spanish director Imanol Uribe was the President of the Jury.

Films in competition
The following films competed for the Golden Pyramid.

Digital Competition
The following films were screened in the Digital Competition for Feature Films category.

Arab Competition
The following films were screened in the Arab Competition for Feature Films category.

Films out of competition
The following films were screened out of the competition.

Juries

International Competition
 Imanol Uribe, Spanish director (President)
 Mohamed Khan, Egyptian director
 Dalia El Behiry, Egyptian Actress
 Grazia Volpi, Italian Producer
 Mahmood Ali-Balogun, Nigerian Director
 Sophie Ndaba, South African actress
 Suzan Najm El Din, Syrian actress
 Gungor Bayrak, Turkish actress
 Anthony Sloman, English director

Digital Competition
 Tarek Al Eryan, Egyptian director (President)
 Karl Baumgartner, German producer
 Silvia Ferreri, Italian actress
 Hisham Al Ghanim, Kuwaiti filmmaker
 Rahmatou Keita, Nigerien director and screenwriter
 Eugen Serbanescu, Romanian editor and screenwriter
 Wayne Drew, English critic

Arab Competition
 Jean Chamoun, Lebanese director (President)
 Djamila Sahraoui, Algerian director
 Sherif Mounir, Egyptian actor
 Sawsan Badr, Egyptian actress
 Daoud Aoulad-Syad, Moroccan director

Awards
The winners of the 2008 Cairo International Film Festival were:

 Golden Pyramid: Retorno a Hansala by Chus Gutiérrez
 Sliver Pyramid: Los by Jan Verheyen
 Best Director: Pernille Fischer Christensen for Dansen
 Saad El-Din Wahba Prize (Best Screenplay):
 Bram Renders for Los
 Safy Nebbou & Cyril Gomez-Mathieu for L'empreinte de l'ange
 Best Actor: Juan Diego Botto for El Greco
 Best Actress: Yolande Moreau for Séraphine
 Naguib Mahfouz Prize (Best Second Work): Safy Nebbou for L'empreite de l'ange
 Youssef Chahine Prize (Best Artistic Contribution): Oliver Pavlus for Tandoori Love
 Special Mention:
 Finding Shangri-La by Ismene Ting (For Cinematography)
 Los girasoles ciegos by José Luis Cuerda
 Best Arabic Film: Mascarades by Lyes Salem
 Best Arabic Screenplay: 
 Rachid Masharawy for Laila's Birthday
 Basra for Ahmed Rashwan
 Golden Award for Digital Films: Nokta by Derviş Zaim
 Silver Award for Digital Films: Goodbye by Bunyo Kimura
 FIPRESCI Prize: Chus Gutiérrez for Retorno a Hansala

External links
Official Cairo International Festival Site (in English) 
 Cairo International Film Festival:2008 at Internet Movie Database

Cairo International Film Festival
Cairo International Film Festival, 2008
Cairo International Film Festival, 2008
2000s in Cairo